The 2009–10 Louisville Cardinals men's basketball team represented the University of Louisville during the 2009–10 NCAA Division I men's basketball season, Louisville's 96th season of intercollegiate competition. The Cardinals competed in the Big East Conference and were coached by Rick Pitino, who was in his ninth season. The team played its home games on Denny Crum Court at Freedom Hall, the final season before moving to the KFC Yum! Center.

The Cardinals finished the season 20–13, 11–7 in Big East play (3rd-T) and lost in the second round of the 2010 Big East men's basketball tournament. They received an at-large bid to the 2010 NCAA Division I men's basketball tournament, earning a 9 seed in the South Region where they lost to 8 seed California in the second round.

Preseason

Departures

Class of 2009 signees

Roster

Schedule

|-

|-
!colspan=9| Big East tournament

|-
!colspan=9| NCAA tournament

References

Louisville Cardinals
Louisville Cardinals men's basketball seasons
Louisville
Louisville Cardinals men's basketball, 2009-10
Louisville Cardinals men's basketball, 2009-10